Pierre Alain Ngalani (born July 7, 1977) is a Cameroonian-born Hong Konger mixed martial artist and Muay Thai kickboxer currently signed to ONE Championship, where he competes in the Heavyweight division. He is a four-time Muay Thai World Champion.

Biography and career 
Ngalani started learning Judo at the age of six, following his brothers. He started showing ability early, winning back-to-back junior tournaments in Cameroon and all over Africa. He was influenced by his mother, who loved the sport and wanted her boys to learn discipline and focus their energy positively. As a youth he cut down his judo training in order to study other styles such as Karate (Shotokan, Koshiki and Kyokushin), Kickboxing, Savate, Sanda and Muay Thai. Later he picked up other disciplines like boxing, jiu-jitsu and wrestling in preparation for fighting in MMA competitions. In addition to martial arts, he worked as a bodyguard for VIPs and high-profile personalities in Côte d'Ivoire before immigrating to Hong Kong in 2001.

Move to Hong Kong and Planet Battle  
While based in Hong Kong, he travelled to Thailand, Japan and Mainland China to win numerous titles. When the "Planet Battle" promotion was formed in 2008, Ngalani became a regular fighter for the organization. After defeating Michael McDonald at Planet Battle I in June 2008, he went on to compete in the 8-man tournament at Planet Battle II in November 2008. Ngalani, who was ordered by doctors not to fight due to a severely injured right knee, lost to Brian Douwes via knockout with a knee in the quarter-final. He then bounced back by knocking out Eduardo Maiorino at Planet Battle III on June 6, 2009. At Planet Battle IV on October 7, 2009, Ngalani defeated Bob Sapp via decision, and then on March 26, 2010, he stopped Carter Williams with low kicks at Planet Battle V.

Ngalani could not continue after getting knocked down with an alleged punch to the back of his head against Dževad Poturak in 2011. The match was for the IKA Super Heavyweight World Championship and was considered a no contest.

ONE Championship 
Alain Ngalani briefly moved back to kickboxing, competing in the ONE Super Series, where he lost to Tarik Khbabez by third-round technical knockout at ONE Championship: Pinnacle of Power on June 23, 2018. On October 6, 2018 at ONE Championship: Kingdom of Heroes, his fight with Andre Meunier ended in a no contest when he was on the receiving end of an accidental low blow.

Mixed martial arts career

ONE Championship

2013 
On September 13, 2013, Ngalani switched from striking to mixed martial arts, debuting with a 31-second spinning heel kick KO win over Mahmoud Hassan at ONE FC: Champions & Warriors.

However, he went without a win in his next three contests as he lost to Paul Cheng by verbal submission at ONE FC: Moment of Truth on December 6, 2013.

2014 
On May 30, 2014, Ngalani faced Chi Lewis-Parry at ONE FC: Honor and Glory. The fight ended in a no contest when Lewis-Parry landed an inadvertent groin strike. He lost their rematch at ONE FC: War of Dragons by first-round knockout via ground-and-pound elbows.

2015 
Ngalani got back to his winning ways with a first-round TKO win over Igor Subora at ONE Championship: Pride of Lions on November 13, 2015.

2016 
On August 13, 2016, he was stopped by Alexandre Machado in the second round at ONE Championship: Heroes of the World.

2017 
He broke the ONE record for fastest heavyweight knockout when he stopped BJJ and judo black belt Hideki Sekine in 11 seconds at ONE Championship: Total Victory on September 16, 2017.

On November 3, 2017, Ngalani faced Aung La Nsang in the ONE Championship's first-ever openweight superfight at ONE Championship: Hero's Dream, where he lost by submission via guillotine choke.

2018 
On March 24, 2018, he recorded his first decision win over Ariunbold Tur-Ochir at ONE Championship: Iron Will.

2019 
Ngalani returned to mixed martial arts on March 8, 2019, where he lost to Mauro Cerilli by first-round TKO at ONE Championship: Reign of Valor.

2020 
On April 28, 2020, news surfaced that Ngalani was scheduled to face Vitor Belfort, who was making his ONE debut. Their bout never materialized as Belfort parted ways with ONE in June 2021 without ever having fought for the promotion.

2021 
On January 12, 2021, ONE Championship announced that Ngalani would instead face Senegalese wrestling champion Oumar Kane in the latter's promotional debut at ONE Championship: Unbreakable 2 on January 29, 2021. Ngalani lost by first-round technical knockout.

Ngalani faced ONE promotional newcomer Thomas Narmo at ONE Championship: Battleground 2 on August 13, 2021. After a groin kick committed by Ngalani, Narmo was unable to continue and the bout was declared a no contest.

Titles 
 International Kickboxing Association
 2011 IKA Super Heavyweight World Champion.

 Planet Battle
 2010 Planet Battle Heavyweight World Champion
 2009 Planet Battle Heavyweight World Champion

 World Professional Muaythai Federation 
 2004 WPMF Muay Thai Heavyweight World Champion, Thailand

 King's Cup
 2004 King's Birthday Cup runner-up, Thailand?

 World Muaythai Council
 2004 Hong Kong Muay Thai Heavyweight Champion (WMC)
 2002 Muay Thai Heavyweight Champion, Surat Thani & Ko Samui, Thailand (WMC)
 Khru in Muay Thai (WMC)

 World Koshiki Karatedo Federation 
 2003 Japan Cup Silver Medal – Heavyweight (WKKF)
 2002–03 Hong Kong Koshiki Karate Heavyweight Champion (WKKF)

 Others
 1998–2001 Heavyweight Kickboxing Champion of Africa (FIKO, UFABA)
 2006 Kuoshu All-Style Martial Arts World Champion
 Black belt in Kyokushin Karate
 2003 King of Sanda, Guangdong Province, China
 Gyoshi 2nd dan black belt in Koshiki Karate

Kickboxing record 

|- style="background:#c5d2ea;"
| 2018-10-06  ||No contest ||align=left| Andre Meunier || ONE Championship: Kingdom of Heroes || Bangkok, Thailand || No contest || 2 || 0:30
|- style="background:#fbb;"
| 2018-06-23 || Loss ||align=left| Tarik Khbabez || |ONE Championship: Pinnacle of Power || Beijing, China || TKO (Punches) || 3 || 1:45
|- style="background:#c5d2ea;"
| 2011-07-30 || No contest ||align=left| Dževad Poturak || Elite Kickboxing || Las Vegas, Nevada, USA || No contest (punch after knockdown) || 1 || 2:06
|-
! style=background:white colspan=8 |
|- style="background:#c5d2ea;"
| 2010-06-11 || No Contest ||align=left| Ramazan Ramazanov || Planet Battle VI ||Wan Chai, Hong Kong || No contest (ring invasion) || 2 ||
|- style="background:#cfc;"
| 2010-03-26 || Win ||align=left| Carter Williams || Planet Battle V || Hong Kong || TKO (low kicks) || 2 ||
|- style="background:#cfc;"
| 2009-10-07 || Win ||align=left| Bob Sapp ||Planet Battle IV ||Wan Chai, Hong Kong ||Decision || 3 || 3:00
|- style="background:#cfc;"
| 2009-06-06 || Win ||align=left| Eduardo Maiorino || Planet Battle III || Hong Kong ||KO (punches) ||1 ||
|- style="background:#fbb;"
| 2008-11-25 || Loss ||align=left| Brian Douwes || Planet Battle II || Hong Kong ||KO (Knee) || 3 ||
|-
! style=background:white colspan=8 |
|-  style="background:#cfc;"
| 2008-06-25 ||Win ||align=left| Michael McDonald || Planet Battle I || Hong Kong || Decision || 3 || 3:00
|-  style="background:#cfc;"
| 2004-04-24 ||Win ||align=left| Marek Olafski || Muay Thai World Championship || Bangkok, Thailand || TKO (Low kicks) || 1 || 
|-
! style=background:white colspan=8 |
|-
| colspan=9 | Legend:

Mixed martial arts record 

|-
| NC
|align=center| 4–6 
|Thomas Narmo
| No Contest (accidental groin kick)
| ONE Championship: Battleground 2
||
|align=center| 2 
|align=center| 4:05
|Kallang, Singapore
| 
|-
|Win
|align=center| 4–6 
|Oumar Kane
|TKO (punches)
| ONE Championship: Unbreakable 2
||
|align=center| 1
|align=center| 4:32
|Kallang, Singapore
|
|-
|Loss
|align=center| 4–5 
|Mauro Cerilli
|TKO (knees)
| ONE Championship: Reign of Valor
||
|align=center| 1
|align=center| 2:30
|Yangon, Myanmar
|
|-
|Win
|align=center|4–4 
|Tur-Ochir Ariunbold
|Decision (split)
|ONE Championship: Iron Will
|
|align=center|3
|align=center|5:00
|Bangkok, Thailand
| 
|-
|Loss
|align=center|3–4 
|Aung La Nsang
|Submission (guillotine choke)
|ONE Championship: Hero's Dream
|
|align=center|1
|align=center|4:31
|Yangon, Myanmar
|
|-
|Win
|align=center|3–3 
|Hideki Sekine
|KO (punch)
|ONE Championship: Total Victory
|
|align=center|1
|align=center|0:11
|Jakarta, Indonesia
|
|-
|Loss
|align=center|2–3 
|Alexandre Machado
|TKO (submission to punches) 
|ONE Championship: Heroes of the World
|
|align=center|2
|align=center|0:21
|Cotai, das Ilhas, Macau, China
|
|-
|Win
|align=center|2–2 
|Igor Subora
|KO (punches)
|ONE Championship: Pride of Lions
|
|align=center|1
|align=center|1:09
|Kallang, Singapore
|
|-
|Loss
|align=center|1–2 
|Chi Lewis Parry
|KO (elbows)
|ONE FC: War of Dragons
|
|align=center|1
|align=center|4:11
|Taipei, Taiwan
|
|-
| NC
|align=center|1–1 
|Chi Lewis Parry
|NC (low blow)
|ONE FC: Honor and Glory
|
|align=center|1
|align=center|N/A
|Singapore, Singapore
|
|-
|Loss
|align=center|1–1
|Paul Cheng
|TKO (submission to punches) 
|ONE FC: Moment of Truth
|
|align=center|1
|align=center|4:54
|Pasay, Philippines
|
|-
|Win
|align=center|1–0
|Mahmoud Hassan
|KO (wheel kick & punches)
|ONE FC: Champions & Warriors
|
|align=center|1
|align=center|0:31
|Jakarta, Indonesia
|
|-

Notes

References

External links 
 

1977 births
Living people
Cameroonian male mixed martial artists
Cameroonian Muay Thai practitioners
Cameroonian sanshou practitioners
Cameroonian expatriates in Hong Kong
Cameroonian male judoka
Cameroonian male karateka
Cameroonian male kickboxers
Cameroonian practitioners of Brazilian jiu-jitsu
Cameroonian savateurs
Heavyweight kickboxers
Karate coaches
Mixed martial artists utilizing Brazilian jiu-jitsu
Mixed martial artists utilizing Kyokushin kaikan
Mixed martial artists utilizing Muay Thai
Mixed martial artists utilizing sanshou
Mixed martial artists utilizing Shotokan
Mixed martial artists utilizing judo
Mixed martial artists utilizing savate
Muay Thai trainers
ONE Championship kickboxers
People with acquired permanent residency of Hong Kong